"Younger" is the debut single by the Swedish pop-soul singer Seinabo Sey. Produced by Magnus Lidehäll, it was released on 25 November 2013 on Universal Music label, becoming a charting hit in Sweden (in January 2014) and Norway (May 2014). The song was featured on BBC Radio 1 as their Track of the Day for 16 April 2015.

Norwegian record producer and remixer Kygo remixed the song, now retitled "Younger (Kygo Remix)". This release reached the top of the Norwegian Singles Chart.

Charts

Weekly charts

Year-end charts

Certifications

Kygo remix

"Younger" was later released as a Kygo remix. It features influences of electronica, chill-out, a bit of dance-pop and house music by the Norwegian musician and remixer Kygo. The song was a number one hit on the Norwegian Singles Chart. In most Countries, the Remix was added to the Original Version.

Charts

References

2013 songs
2013 debut singles
Number-one singles in Norway
Swedish electronic songs
Synth-pop ballads
2010s ballads